"Crazy World" is a single by the Dublin group Aslan released in 1993. Taken from the album Goodbye Charlie Moonhead, the song reached number four on the Irish Singles Chart and stayed in the charts for three months, becoming one of the most played songs on Irish radio in 1993. The song also won "Single of The Year" at 1993's Hot Press Awards.

Chart positions

References

External links
Youtube Video

1993 singles
Aslan (band) songs
1993 songs